Hell-fire preaching is a religious term that refers to preaching which calls attention to the final destiny of the impenitent, which usually focuses extremely on describing the painful torment in the Hereafter as a method to invite people to religion. There may be degrees of emphasis, and degrees of extent to which hell is emphasized in the khutbah (sermon or speech in Islam).

Notable hellfire preachers

Christians 
 Jonathan Edwards
 Charles Grandison Finney
 W. P. Nicholson

Muslims 
 Ibn Karram
 Muhammad Hussein Yacoub

See also 

 Expository preaching
 Extemporaneous preaching
 Fire and brimstone
 Preacher

References 

Speeches by type
Sermons
Religious terminology
Hell